Assassination is a 2015 South Korean period action spy film co-written and directed by Choi Dong-hoon. The film, mainly set in 1930s Seoul and Shanghai during the Japanese occupation of Korea, depicts a group of Korean resistance fighters’ plan to assassinate a highly ranked Japanese officer.

The film drew over 12.7 million admissions, and is currently the eighth-highest-grossing movie in Korean film history. Assassination also won Best Film at the 36th Blue Dragon Film Awards and 52nd Baeksang Arts Awards.

Plot
In 1911, during Japan's rule over Korea, a resistance fighter named Yem Sek-jin tries but fails to murder the governor-general along with a pro-Japanese businessman named Kang In-guk. That evening, Kang discovers that his own wife was helping Yem, and kills her. In response, the wet nurse runs off with one of Kang's twin daughters. By 1933, there are over 30 Korean independence factions operating in Korea, China, and Manchuria. Yem has become a captain in one of these factions, but his colleagues are unaware that he is secretly reporting to the Japanese, since back in 1911 he was tortured by the Japanese into submission. Yem meets with some Korean politicians in Hangzhou, including Kim Koo and Kim Won-bong, and is asked to gather three delinquent resistance members—Big Gun, Duk-sam, and Ahn Okyun—so they can enter Seoul and assassinate Kang, along with a general named Kawaguchi Mamoru. After bringing them to Shanghai, however, Yem sells this information to the Japanese. The Japanese attempt to find Ahn, but a skilled contract-killer named Hawaii Pistol decides, on the spur of the moment, to pretend that Ahn is his wife, allowing her to elude the soldiers.

Kim Koo questions Yem's loyalty, and tells two subordinates, Myung-woo and Se-gwang, to follow him around, and to kill him if he is a spy. However, when they follow him to his meeting with Hawaii Pistol, Yem manages to kill them in the ensuing gun fight. Yem meets with Hawaii Pistol and hires him to intercept and kill the three resistance members, lying to Hawaii Pistol by saying that they are Japanese spies. Yem anticipates a great reward from the Japanese. As Hawaii Pistol and his assistant Buddy travel to Seoul, they befriend Kawaguchi's son, who is a lieutenant in the Kwantung Army. In Seoul, Hawaii Pistol locates Big Gun and shoots him as he is running. With Big Gun missing, Duk-sam and Ahn proceed with the operation, hoping to ambush their targets at a gas station. To their misfortune, the car is a decoy and both Duk-sam and Korean sympathizer Kimura are killed in the attempt. Ahn is then ambushed by Hawaii Pistol, but he recognizes and spares her, and even sympathizes with her mission, since he is himself a Korean. Ahn discovers that she is Kang's missing twin daughter. The other daughter, who happens to be engaged to Kawaguchi's son, recognizes Ahn and visits her apartment, but is killed by her father Kang, Yem and a group of soldiers. The latter are none the wiser and believe they have successfully killed Ahn. At this point, Ahn assumes her twin's identity, and a few days later, enters the wedding as the bride. Assisted by Hawaii Pistol, Buddy, and Big Gun—who survived his injuries—they carry out an attack on the wedding. Ahn kills Kawaguchi, and Hawaii Pistol kills Kang when Ahn hesitates to do so, revealing that he killed his father, a Japanese sympathizer, and did not want Ahn to live with that and become a mercenary like him. Big Gun is killed while covering their escape, taking Kawaguchi's son hostage, they are hemmed in by army reinforcements. Hawaii Pistol, realizing that she can still pose as her twin, shares a kiss with Ahn, promising to meet her again in the cafe they met in Shanghai. Ahn walks out and is rescued by the Japanese soldiers—she later absconds back to Shanghai. Hawaii Pistol and Buddy attempt to escape, but Yem kills them.

For his services to Japan, Yem is made head of the secret police. However, the Japanese are defeated in World War II and Korea is liberated. In 1949, a commission for war crimes investigates Yem—now a senior officer with the Korean police—who protests his innocence and points to his resistance service. The only witness to Yem's guilt is found murdered, so the charges are dropped. Even so, Yem is cornered on the streets by Ahn and Myung-woo, who survived his injuries earlier in the film but was rendered mute and slightly disfigured. They proceed to shoot Yem and he dies. Ahn sadly recalls her friends in the Resistance, Hawaii Pistol and Buddy before the screen fades out.

Cast

Jun Ji-hyun as Ahn Ok-yun / Mitsuko
Lee Jung-jae as Yem Sek-jin 
Ha Jung-woo as "Hawaii Pistol"
Oh Dal-su as "Buddy"
Cho Jin-woong as Chu Sang-ok AKA "Big Gun"
Lee Geung-young as Kang In-guk
Choi Deok-moon as Hwang Duk-sam
Kim Eui-sung as Butler of Kang family
Park Byung-eun as Kawaguchi Shunsuke
Jin Kyung as Ahn Seong-sim
Heo Ji-won as Myung-woo
Kim Hong-pa as Kim Koo
Jung Gyu-soo as Hunchback
Kim Kang-woo as Special investigator
Shim Cheol-jong as Kawaguchi Mamoru
Han Dong-gyu as Police chief
Jeong Gi-seop as Military police leader
Jung In-gyeom as Sasaki
Lee Hwan as Se-gwang
Tamura Hiroto as Kimura
Lee Young-seok as Terauchi Masatake
Shim Hee-seop as Public prosecutor
Yoon Jong-gu as Anti-National Crimes Special Committee investigator
Hong Won-gi as Judge
Heo Jeong-do as Consulate employee
Woo Sang-jeon as Ye Wanyong
Cho Seung-woo as Kim Won-bong (special appearance)
Kim Hae-sook as Cafe Anemone owner (special appearance)
Hong Seong-deok as Dentist
Kim Joon-woo as Sontag Hotel manager

Production
A special set of 13,500 square meters was created in Goyang, Gyeonggi Province, to recreate the Seosomun Street in Gyeongseong. The rest of the filming took place at the Shanghai set in Chedun, which is 27 times the size of the Hapcheon set in South Gyeongsang Province. (The 2007 Chinese film Lust, Caution was also shot in Chedun.)

Music
 Antonín Dvořák's Humoresques Op. 101, No. 7 (heard during the group photo scene)
 Antonín Dvořák's Symphony No. 9
 Robert Schumann's Kinderszenen Op. 15 Träumerei (heard during Ahn Ok-yun posed as Mitsuko at her home)
 Johannes Brahms's Hungarian Dances No. 17
 Frédéric Chopin's Piano Concerto #1 in E Minor, Op.11
 Richard Wagner's Die Meistersinger von Nürnberg Vorspiel zum III. Aufzug-Knappertsbusch
 Jean Gabin's Leo, Lea, Elie issued from album DOM_1606 of Disques Dom (heard during the dancing scene after the three assassins arrived in Nanking)

Reception

Box office
Opening on 1,260 screens on July 22, 2015, Assassination earned  ( (exchange rate 2016.05.04)) from 478,000 admissions. It was the best opening day for a local film in 2015 and the second-best opening day overall in Korea behind Avengers: Age of Ultron. The film earned  at the Chinese box office.

Critical reception
Assassination has received mixed to positive reviews, holding an 88% "Certified Fresh" on Rotten Tomatoes, most reviews of which praises the film's entertainment value but criticizes its length and complicated narrative. Village Voices Simon Abrams found the film's highlights to be during its lighthearted scenes, and summarized Assassination as "the kind of overstuffed historical mega-production that Hollywood doesn't make anymore." Although lamenting the film's characters and running time, Screen Daily's Jason Bechervaise praised Choi Dong-hoon's direction and his execution of the movie's action sequences. The Washington City Paper praised the film as a "revelation for Korean cinema and a rediscovery of form."

The New York Times Jeanette Catsoulis also praised the film's action scenes, but argued that its screenplay contained too many characters and surmised that "it's possible to follow [Assassination] without taking notes, but I wouldn't recommend it." Similarly, The Hollywood Reporters Clarence Tsui admired the high production values of the film, but heavily disapproved of its poor characterizations and Choi's approach to the historical film genre, particularly labeling the film's ending as "half-baked commentary."

Plagiarism lawsuit
On August 10, 2015, novelist Choi Jong-rim filed a lawsuit against director Choi Dong-hoon, production company Caper Film and distributor Showbox, alleging that various elements from Assassination, including the setting and the female protagonist, highly resemble those of his book Korean Memories, published in 2003. Choi is seeking  ( (exchange rate 2016.05.04)) in damages. Caper Film denied those claims, rebutting that the female character in Choi's novel is not a sniper, and that assassination schemes were common in the anti-Japanese movement.

Seoul Central District Court rejected Choi's request for an injunction to stop the film from being shown in theaters, ruling on August 19, 2015, that an abstract summary cannot be protected by copyright laws, the female protagonists in the novel and the film are "depicted in completely different ways" with the assassination plan not a major plot point in the novel, and that supporting characters Kim Koo and Kim Won-bong are real historical figures and hence cannot be viewed as a source of similarity between the two works.

Awards and nominations

References

External links
 

2015 films
Films about the Korean independence movement
Films set in 1911
Films set in 1933
Films set in 1949
Films set in Korea under Japanese rule
Films shot in Shanghai
Films shot in Seoul
Best Picture Blue Dragon Film Award winners
South Korean spy action films
South Korean spy thriller films
Films involved in plagiarism controversies
Korean Sign Language films
Films about contract killing
Showbox films
2010s South Korean films